Toni Rossall (born 19 October 1995), better known by the ring name Toni Storm, is a New Zealand-Australian professional wrestler. She is signed to AEW, where she is a former AEW Women's World Champion. She previously worked for WWE, where she was a former NXT UK Women's Champion.

Storm first gained attention in WWE from her 2017 and 2018 performances in the Mae Young Classic tournament. She progressed to the tournament's semi-finals in 2017, and won it in 2018 at Evolution, WWE's first all-female PPV. She then performed on the NXT UK, NXT, and SmackDown brands before her release in 2021. Beyond WWE, she has performed in Japanese promotion Stardom, where she became the first non-Japanese wrestler to hold the World of Stardom Championship. She also held Stardom's SWA World Championship for a record-setting reign of 612 days. In the British promotion Progress Wrestling, she held the Progress Women's Championship. In the German promotion wXw, she held the wXw Women's Championship twice.

Early life 
Toni Rossall was born in Auckland on 19 October 1995, and moved to Australia's Gold Coast with her mother at the age of four when her parents separated. At the age of 10, while living on the Gold Coast, she discovered WWE on television and developed an interest in professional wrestling.

Professional wrestling career

Early career 
Rossall began training at the Australian affiliate of New Zealand promotion Impact Pro Wrestling (not to be confused with the American promotion Impact Wrestling) and debuted for the company under the ring name Storm (which she later changed to Toni Storm) on 9 October 2009, when she was 13 years old. At the age of 18, after five years of honing her skills with Impact, she decided she wanted to receive further training to become a better wrestler; she convinced her mother to let her move to England and live with her grandmother, who was based in Liverpool. While in England, she trained under Dean Allmark. She started working internationally in countries such as Finland, France, Germany, and Spain. Storm took part in a WWE tryout camp in Melbourne during WWE's 2014 Australian tour, and attended another tryout camp in Manchester during WWE's 2015 UK tour.

Progress Wrestling (2015–2018) 
Storm made her debut for Progress Wrestling on 14 April 2015, being defeated by Elizabeth. In May 2017, she became the first-ever Progress Women's Champion after defeating Jinny and Laura Di Matteo in a three-way match. This match marked the first time that female wrestlers competed in the main event of a Progress event. Throughout the year, Storm went on to successfully defend the championship numerous times against challengers like Kay Lee Ray, Laura Di Matteo and Candice LeRae. She lost the title to Jinny at Chapter 69: Be Here Now.

World Wonder Ring Stardom (2016–2018) 
In 2016, Storm began working for the Japanese promotion Stardom, where she won the SWA World Championship on 24 July. On 2 October 2016, Stardom officially announced that Storm had signed with the promotion. After winning the 2017 Cinderella Tournament on 30 April, Storm also won the 2017 5★Star GP on 18 September, becoming the first wrestler to win the two tournaments in the same year. On 24 September, Storm became the new World of Stardom Champion in an unplanned finish, when Mayu Iwatani was legitimately injured during a title defense against her, prompting the referee to stop the match and award Storm the title. On 9 June 2018, Kagetsu defeated Storm in a title match, ending her reign at 258 days.

WWE (2017–2021) 
On 16 June 2017, WWE announced Storm as one of the first four participants of the Mae Young Classic. Storm entered the tournament on 13 July, defeating Ayesha Raymond in the first round. The following day, Storm defeated Lacey Evans in the second round and Piper Niven in the quarterfinals, before being eliminated from the tournament in the semi-finals by Kairi Sane. On 9 May 2018, Storm was advertised for the upcoming United Kingdom Championship Tournament. On 24 May, Storm signed a WWE contract. On 18 June at the United Kingdom Championship Tournament, Storm defeated Killer Kelly and Isla Dawn in a triple threat match to become the #1 contender for the NXT Women's Championship. The following day at the NXT U.K. Championship, Storm was defeated by the defending NXT Women's Champion Shayna Baszler. Months later, she participated in the second Mae Young Classic, a tournament she won when she defeated Io Shirai at WWE Evolution.

She also participated in a tournament to crown the inaugural NXT UK Women's Champion, but she lost against Rhea Ripley. In a rematch on 12 January 2019 at NXT UK TakeOver: Blackpool, Storm defeated Ripley to win the title. She reigned as champion until 31 August 2019 at NXT UK TakeOver: Cardiff, where Storm lost her title to Kay Lee Ray, ending her reign at 230 days.

On 24 November 2019 on the TakeOver: WarGames post-show Q&A session with Triple H, Storm was announced to be a part of the NXT Women's Survivor Series team by team captain Rhea Ripley. At Survivor Series, Storm was eliminated via submission by Natalya and Sasha Banks. At NXT UK TakeOver: Blackpool II, Storm competed unsuccessfully in a triple threat match for the NXT UK Women's Championship against Kay Lee Ray and Piper Niven. Storm participated in the women's Royal Rumble match at the namesake pay-per-view and entered at #20 but was eliminated by Shayna Baszler. Storm wrestled her last match in the brand on 27 February 2020 episode of NXT UK, losing to Kay Lee Ray in an "I quit" match.

After a 8-month hiatus, on 4 October 2020 at TakeOver 31, Storm returned to NXT following the NXT Women's Championship match between Io Shirai and Candice LeRae. She then joined Candice LeRae's team with Dakota Kai, and Raquel González for TakeOver: WarGames. At Royal Rumble, she entered as #7 and was eliminated by Rhea Ripley. She then competed in a triple threat match for the NXT Women's Championship involving Mercedes Martinez and reigning champion Io Shirai at TakeOver: Vengeance Day in a losing effort. On 10 March 2021 episode of NXT, Storm challenged Shirai for the title, where she was again unsuccessful.

Storm debuted on SmackDown on 23 July episode, defeating Zelina Vega. She was then defeated by Vega during the Queen's Crown tournament in the first round. She participated in the 5 on 5 Survivor Series elimination match at Survivor Series; eliminating both Carmella and Vega but was then eliminated by Liv Morgan. Storm then began a program with SmackDown Women's Champion Charlotte Flair with Storm winning their first bout via disqualification. She then received her title opportunity on the Christmas Eve edition of SmackDown in a losing effort. This was her last televised appearance in WWE; the following week, on 29 December 2021, Storm requested a release from her WWE contract and it was immediately granted. In an interview with Renee Paquette six months later, she explained the reasons that led to her departure from the company and said, "I didn't feel that appreciated. And I just felt like [WWE], at times, didn't have very much respect for me. I feel like, over time, they just crushed my love for wrestling. It just wasn't even wrestling anymore. You're not even allowed to say 'wrestling'."

All Elite Wrestling (2022–present) 
Storm made her AEW debut on 30 March 2022 episode of Dynamite as a participant in the qualifier match for the Owen Hart Foundation Women's Tournament, defeating The Bunny. AEW then announced Storm signed with the company. Storm defeated Jamie Hayter in the quarterfinals of the tournament, and she was defeated by Britt Baker in the semi-finals. On Road Rager special episode of Dynamite, Storm defeated Baker in a rematch to challenge AEW Women's Champion Thunder Rosa for the title at AEW x NJPW: Forbidden Door in a losing effort. At All Out, Storm defeated Baker, Hayter, and Hikaru Shida in a four-way match to become AEW Interim Women's World Champion. She then defended her title against Athena, Baker, and Serena Deeb at Grand Slam. She lost her championship in a title match against Hayter at Full Gear. On the following episode of Dynamite, AEW recognized Storm's reign as lineal due to Rosa forfeiting the title.

Other media 
As Toni Storm, Rossall is a playable character in the video games WWE 2K20 and WWE 2K22.

In August 2022, Rossall was featured as the cover girl of Fitness Gurls magazine.

Personal life 
In June 2020, it was revealed that Rossall was dating American wrestler Juice Robinson. They were married in 2022.

On 22 June 2021, Rossall came out as bisexual during her takeover of the WWE NXT Instagram account for Pride Month.

Championships and accomplishments 

 All Action Wrestling
 AAW Women's Championship (1 time)
 All Elite Wrestling
 AEW Women's World Championship (1 time)
 British Empire Wrestling
 BEW Women's Championship (1 time)
 Pro Wrestling Alliance Queensland
 PWAQ Women's Championship (1 times)
 PWAQ Women's Underground Championship (1 time)
 Pro Wrestling Illustrated
 Ranked No. 13 of the top 100 female wrestlers in the PWI Women's 100 in 2019
 Progress Wrestling
 Progress Women's Championship (1 time)
 Natural Progression Series IV
 Sports Illustrated
 Ranked No. 7 in the top 10 women's wrestlers in 2018
 Westside Xtreme Wrestling
 wXw Women's Championship (2 times)
 Femmes Fatales (2017)
 World Wonder Ring Stardom
 SWA World Championship (1 time)
 World of Stardom Championship (1 time)
 5★Star GP (2017)
 Cinderella Tournament (2017)
 Stardom Year-End Award (1 time)
 MVP Award (2017)
 WWE
 NXT UK Women's Championship (1 time)
 Mae Young Classic (2018)

References

External links 

 
 
 

1995 births
Australian female professional wrestlers
Australian expatriate sportspeople in Japan
Australian expatriate sportspeople in the United States
Australian people of New Zealand descent
Bisexual sportspeople
Bisexual women
LGBT professional wrestlers
Australian LGBT sportspeople
New Zealand LGBT sportspeople
Expatriate professional wrestlers
Living people
New Zealand female professional wrestlers
New Zealand expatriate sportspeople in Australia
New Zealand expatriate sportspeople in Japan
New Zealand expatriate sportspeople in the United States
New Zealand people of English descent
NXT UK Women's Champions
Sportspeople from Auckland
Sportspeople from the Gold Coast, Queensland
21st-century New Zealand women
All Elite Wrestling personnel
21st-century professional wrestlers
World of Stardom Champions
Progress Wrestling World Women's Champions
AEW Women's World Champions